The peaceful betta or crescent betta (Betta imbellis) is a species of gourami native to Southeast Asia.

Betta imbellis has a pair of suprabranchial chambers that each house an air‐breathing organ known as the labyrinth organ, a complex bony structure lined with thin, highly vascularised respiratory epithelium. The labyrinth organ is a morpho‐physiological adaptation that allows the B. imbellis to extract oxygen from air. This adaptation allows the species to persist in extreme conditions.

Description

Distribution
Betta imbellis occurs naturally in Southern Thailand, Malaysia, and Indonesia, although it has been introduced to Singapore.

Habitat
Betta imbellis lives in sluggish bodies of water, including rice paddies, swamps, streams and ponds, with a substrate composed of leaf litter and mud.

Conservation status
Betta imbellis is listed as least concern by the IUCN Red List. It is still threatened by pollution and hybridization with released domesticated bettas (Siamese fighting fish) and other bettas in the B. splendens complex.

Diet
In the wild, Betta imbellis feeds on terrestrial and aquatic invertebrates. In captivity, the species can be fed live or frozen food like Daphnia, Artemia or bloodworms.

Breeding
Male and female individuals of Betta imbellis can live together outside breeding season, as well as getting together for breeding. Males will build a bubble nest before breeding. After mating the male catches the falling eggs and places them in his bubble nest. In 1–2 days the eggs hatch and continue absorb their yolk sack for 2 days. After that the fry become free swimming. Until this the male cares for them.

Human use
Betta imbellis is found in the aquarium trade.

References

External links

 Betta imbellis care sheet at FishGeeks

Peaceful betta
Freshwater fish of Indonesia
Freshwater fish of Malaysia
Fish of Singapore
Fish of Thailand
Taxa named by Werner Ladiges
Fish described in 1975